The Janusz A. Zajdel Award (Nagroda imienia Janusza A. Zajdla), often called just Zajdel,
is the annual award given by the Polish science fiction and fantasy fandom for the best stories published in the previous year. The winners are chosen in a vote by fans present at the Polcon convention from up to five nominations in each of two categories:
Novel: works longer than 100 standard pages (of 1800 characters),
Short story: shorter works.

Instant-runoff voting with "No award" as one of the choices is the method used.
Vote counts are not announced.

History
After the death of the first winner, Janusz A. Zajdel, in the same year, the name was changed in his memory.

Until 1989, the award was given by Polish science fiction fan associations, voting as units; since 1990, all fans present at Polcon can vote. 

Until 1991, there was a single award given for the best story; since 1992, there are two categories: novel and short story.

In 2014, a free online e-book of the stories nominated for year 2013 was made available.

Winners
The year given is the year of publication. Since 1992, novels and short stories have been judged separately.

Winner summaries

2019: Radek Rak, Baśń o wężowym sercu...

The novel is loosely based on the legends about Jakub Szela, the leader of a 1846 peasant uprising known as the Galician slaughter. It gained several other literary awards.

2019: Marta Potocka, "Chomik"
Marta Potocka is a young writer, with several short stories. She works as a programmer. Her winning work "Chomik" ["Hamster"] was published in the e-zine , no. 5, 2019. The story is set in the near future Poland. The heavily criticized Social Insurance Institution is closed and the basic social security payment is introduced to everybody subject to the condition that to qualify for it the person must join the program of Social Monitoring. The Social Insurance Institution is replaced with the Social Balance Institution, whose function is to control that people spend as much money as possible. Those who do not want to spend are called "hamsters", i.e., "hoarders". An employee of SII tries to handle a particularly tough "hamster" and fails, but instead uncovers a much larger problem.  Chomik is available online.

References

External links

The Award homepage (in Polish)

Polish science fiction awards
Polish literary awards
Awards established in 1985
Janusz Zajdel
1985 establishments in Poland